Pagliero (Occitan Palhier) is a village and a former community in the Maira Valley, Province of Cuneo, Italy. It is a frazione of the commune of San Damiano Macra, and a parish of the catholic diocese of Saluces.

It should not be confused with Paglieres, another village in the same commune of San Damiano Macra. Old charters name it Paliarum or Paglierum. It was cited as early as in 1028 in the charter of the foundation of the abbey of Carmagnola. It was a part of the marquisate of San Damiano. In 1716 it was merged with San Damiano.

In 1931, the village had 902 inhabitants.

References

Frazioni of the Province of Cuneo